Chiquito is a restaurant chain based in the United Kingdom specialising in Tex-Mex foods. It also serves food via its virtual restaurants Cornstar Tacos and Kickass Burritos.

History
The company was established in 1989, and has sixty eight restaurants across the country. It dubs itself as 'The Original Mexican Grill & Bar', and has been described as the United Kingdom's best known Mexican chain. Chiquito restaurants are part of the Restaurant Group.

Following the coronavirus pandemic, it was announced that restaurants of Chiquito would not be reopening after social distancing restrictions are lifted. In an announcement to the stock exchange on 18 March, owners The Restaurant Group announced their intention to place Chiquito into administration. The chain re-opened a limited number of its restaurants in August 2020.

Decor and style
The restaurants, which tend to feature a large bar and lounge style restaurant have rustic interior décor, based on traditional Mexican architecture and culture, where old Mexican posters and photos adorn the walls, alongside piñatas plates, balloons, castanets, fans, and sombreros. Spanish and Mexican music played throughout the restaurant.

Notable past employees
Nick Frost, actor and writer, worked at the Staples Corner (London) branch where he first met Simon Pegg.

Environmental record
In November 2015, the chain was one of seven restaurants surveyed that failed to meet a basic level of sustainability in its seafood.

References

External links

Restaurant groups in the United Kingdom
Restaurants established in 1989
Mexican restaurants